Body worship is the practice of physically revering a part of another person's body, and is usually done as a submissive act in the context of BDSM. It is often an expression of erotic fetishism but it can also be used as part of service-oriented submission or sexual roleplay. It typically involves kissing, licking or sucking parts of a dominant's body such as the vulva, the penis, the buttocks, the feet, the breasts or the muscles.

Dominatrices sometimes use body worship as part of dominance and submission. This may involve stroking, massaging or bathing the dominatrix or kissing and licking her buttocks. Alternatively the submissive may be instructed to perform cunnilingus or anilingus, in some cases while the dominatrix is facesitting on the submissive.

See also

Boot worship
Buttock fetishism
Breast fetishism
Foot fetishism
Hand fetishism
Muscle worship
Partialism
Phallus

References

BDSM terminology